Zopa Ltd. is a British financial services company which offers deposit accounts, personal loans and credit cards. It began as the world's first peer-to-peer lending company in 2005 and gained a full banking licence in 2020. The peer-to-peer side of its business closed in December 2021.

History
Zopa was launched in the UK in March 2005 as an arranger of peer-to-peer lending, connecting investors with individuals seeking loans. It was founded in Buckinghamshire in 2004 by a team from the internet banking company Egg Banking.

Zopa grew steadily in the years prior to the financial crisis of 2007–2008. It navigated the period with no losses to investors' capital and only a small dip in returns during 2008.

In September 2016, the first portfolio of Zopa loans was securitised on the European markets.

In January 2017, Zopa became the first UK based peer-to-peer lending company to lend more than £2 billion worth of loans. Zopa became fully regulated by the Financial Conduct Authority in May 2017. Following FCA authorisation, and HMRC approval as an Individual Savings Account (ISA) manager, Zopa started offering Innovative Finance ISA products in June 2017.

In November 2016, Zopa announced its intention to apply for a banking licence so it could expand the range of financial products it offers to UK consumers. In August 2018, Zopa obtained £44 million in funding for the launch of its new digital challenger bank. In December 2018 the company was awarded interim banking licences by the UK financial regulators, the FCA and PRA.

Retail banking services – including deposit accounts and a credit card – were launched in June 2020, soon after a full banking licence was awarded. By March 2021, Zopa had attracted around £250m in fixed-term savings accounts and had become a "top ten" credit card issuer. In the same month, the company raised £20m further capital from its existing lenders.

In June 2021, CEO Jaidev Janardana stated that Zopa could be taken public as early as the last quarter of 2022. In October of that year, the company raised $300million from Softbank Vision Fund and other investors, implying a $1billion valuation. A further £75m was raised from existing investors, not including Softbank, in early 2023.

In December 2021, Zopa announced it would be winding up the peer-to-peer side of its business, including buying back the existing loans of investors.

In early 2023, Zopa had around 850,000 customers, over £3billion in deposits and £2billion on loan. The company indicated that it expected to make a profit over the full year for the first time in its history.

In February 2023, it was announced Zopa had acquired the Newcastle-under-Lyme-headquartered, 'buy now, pay later’ (BNPL) platform DivideBuy.

Products and services

Peer-to-peer lending 
Zopa enabled investors to lend to UK consumers through its peer-to-peer lending platform. By 2021, around £6billion in loans had been processed. Borrowers could take out loans between £1,000 and £25,000. Typically individuals used these to funds to help buy a car, consolidate debts, cover home improvements or weddings.

Investors could choose from four investment products based on their risk and return appetite. Investors' money was split across multiple borrowers. Investors then received monthly repayments of interest and capital, which they could re-lend to compound the interest.

In December 2021, Zopa announced that it would withdraw from peer-to-peer lending with the intent to repay all investors no later than 31 January 2022.

Banking and credit cards 
Zopa offers FSCS-protected deposit accounts, personal loans, credit cards, and a money management app which makes use of data made available by the introduction of Open Banking.

Corporate identity
The company's main office is at London Bridge. Since 2017, Zopa also has a development centre in Barcelona, Spain.

The company's name comes from "zone of possible agreement", a negotiating term identifying the bounds within which agreement can be reached between two parties.

See also
 Comparison of crowd funding services
 Peer-to-peer lending

References

External links
 

Peer-to-peer lending companies
British companies established in 2005
Banks based in the City of London